Krčméry is a Slovak surname. Notable people with the surname include:
 Štefan Krčméry (1892–1955), Slovak poet
 Vladimír Krčméry (1960–2022), Slovak physician

Slovak-language surnames